A Guide to the Birds of Mexico and Northern Central America is a field guide to birds, covering 1070 species found in Mexico and five other countries in northern Central America (Guatemala, Belize, El Salvador, Honduras and Nicaragua).  It is a 1995 book by Steve N. G. Howell and Sophie Webb, published by Oxford University Press.

A 60-page introduction outlines the geographical area covered, explains the areas geography and bird distribution within it, and discusses climate and habitat, and bird migration. Also included within this introduction are a section summarising the history of ornithology in the region, and essay on conservation, and a short summary of birding within the region. The introduction is followed by a 25-page section entitled "Using this book". This is then followed by the species accounts themselves, from pages 87 to 764.

A series of five appendices covers extinct species, species of hypothetical occurrence, birds of Pacific islands, of Gulf and Caribbean islands, and those found in eastern Honduras. These are followed by a 26-page bibliography, and indexes to English and scientific names.

The covers are illustrated with paintings of Mexican birds: a black-throated magpie-jay on the front cover, a short-crested coquette on the spine, and an unspotted saw-whet owl and two plumbeous kites on the rear cover.

71 colour plates are placed centrally within the book, between pages 400 and 401.

Footnotes

Bibliography
 Howell, Steve N. G. and Sophie Webb (1995) A guide to the birds of Mexico and northern Central America 

Bird field guides
1995 non-fiction books